Mundka is a census town and village in the West Delhi district of Delhi. It is the birthplace and village of former Chief Minister of Delhi, the late Dr. Sahib Singh Verma. Its neighbouring villages are Bakkarwala and Nangloi. The current MLA of the Mundka constituency is Dharampal Lakra, a member of the Aam Aadmi Party (AAP).

Demographics
According to the 2011 India census, Mundka had a population of 57,590. Males constituted 56% of the population and females 44%. Mundka had an average literacy rate of 78%, higher than the national average of 74.04%. Male literacy was 75%, and female literacy was 65%. At that time, 16% of the population was under six years of age. The village falls under the 8th Assembly of Delhi.

Administration and infrastructure

The constituency has been in the news for its very poor infrastructure, despite having a popular metro station. The streets have small drains, which cause the sewers to overflow after just a few minutes of rain. The lack of basic infrastructure cause some people to believe that Mundka is one of the most corrupt constituencies in Delhi. Anil Lakra is the current municipal councillor.

The village has its own community center, library, parks, and government primary school and high school. It is also a central point for aeronautical colleges and Delhi Metro Depot.

Transportation

The Mundka station of Delhi Metro was inaugurated on 2 April 2010. The  corridor, from Mundka to Inderlok, serves thousands of people daily. The corridor, also called the Green Line, connects Inderlok (on Dilshad Garden – Rithala line) and Kirti Nagar (on Dwarka – Noida City Centre / Vaishali line). It is 22 km from Connaught place (Delhi) and 10 km from Bahadurgarh (Haryana).

Dada Bhero Temple
Dada Bhero Temple is a well-known temple in the village. During the annual bhandara (free community meal at a temple) in the name of Dada Bhero, people from native villagers to non-Indian visitors can come and have food.

References

Cities and towns in West Delhi district
Villages in West Delhi district